The Slovak Extraliga 2005–06 was the thirteenth regular season of the Slovak Extraliga, the top level of professional ice hockey in Slovakia.

Regular season

Final standings

Key - GP: Games played, W: Wins, OTW: Over time wins, T: Ties, OTL: Over time losses, L: Losses, GF: Goals for, GA: Goals against, PTS: Points.

Playoffs

Playoff bracket

Playout

Scoring Leaders

Regular season

Key - GP: Games played, G: Goals, A: Assists, PTS: Points.

Play-off

2005-06 All Star Team

Final rankings

External links
 Slovak Ice Hockey Federation

Slovak Extraliga seasons
Slovak
Slovak